Bounds is a surname. Notable people with the surname include:

Bobby Bounds (born 1969), American football player
Dallen Bounds (1971–1999), American serial killer
Dennis Bounds (born 1977), American news anchor
Jon Bounds (born 1975), English blogger
Mark Bounds, American football player
Philip Bounds, British historian
Sydney James Bounds (1920–2006), English author
Tucker Bounds, American politician

See also
 Bound (surname)